IKB is an initialism that can refer to

 International Klein Blue, a deep blue hue
 IκB [I-kappa-B], a protein complex
 IKB Deutsche Industriebank, a German bank
 Ikebukuro Station, JR East station code
 Isambard Kingdom Brunel, British engineer